Gessopalena is a comune and town in the province of Chieti in the Abruzzo region of central Italy.

Twin towns
 Porto San Giorgio, Italy
 Cupramontana, Italy
 Sambreville, Belgium

References

Cities and towns in Abruzzo